Nieu-Bethesda (Afrikaans for New Bethesda) is a village in the Eastern Cape at the foot of the Sneeuberge, approximately  north of Graaff Reinet. It was founded in 1875 as a church town, like many other Karoo villages, and attained municipal status in 1886. The name is of biblical origin and means "place of flowing water".

History

Nieu Bethesda is situated on the farm, Uitkyk, which belonged to BJ Pienaar. There was a very strong water supply on the farm and BJ Pienaar changed the course of the Gats River to drain the marshes and turn the area into fertile fields – where Nieu Bethesda stands today. On 15 December 1874, the farmers of this area met for the first time with a view to establishing a village and Dutch Reformed Church congregation. A town council was elected. In February 1875, a petition group of 169 men met the church council of Graaff-Reinet, headed by the Reverend Charles Murray, son of the first preacher Andrew Murray. On the same day, negotiations were concluded to buy Uitkyk from Pienaar's sons. It was not until 1878 that Graaff-Reinet agreed to the petitions of the Nieu Bethesda people. Rev. Charles Murray named the new settlement Nieu Bethesda in reference to the strong fountain and its biblical reference. In 1880, the church struggled to run the village so, in 1886,  it became a municipality, but with administrative rights only. The church retained the properties. This meant that residents had to pay two taxes, an arrangement that led to friction for many generations. The town experienced a period of growth from its establishment in 1870s to about 1930. Nieu-Bethesda was eclipsed by larger towns during the 1930s and ‘40s. The Great Depression, improved transport and the town's isolated location led to a mass exodus, leaving the town in an impoverished state.

The town of Nieu Bethesda carries a peculiar history and has therefore become a tourist attraction. The Dutch Reformed Church which was founded in 1875 in the area began holding its services in BJ Pienaar's wagon house. A new church building was inaugurated in 1905. The Wagon House (now known as the Old Church Hall) was then used as a church hall and a venue for English church services.

In the 1930s, a Nieu Bethesda-born teacher known as Helen Martins returned to the town. After her father's death in 1945, Martins began transforming her home into a work of art. She employed Koos Malgas, a Nieu Bethesda local to assist her with her artwork. She and Malgas constructed cement and glass statues inspired by biblical texts, the poetry of Omar Khayyam, and the works by William Blake. In 1976, Martins aged seventy-eight, took her own life by swallowing caustic soda. Martin's house known as The Owl House is now run by the Owl House Foundation formed in 1996 and is now a major tourist attraction. 

The town was also thrust into the spotlight by one of its residents James Kitching, vertebrate palaeontologist. Kitching became famous for collecting specimens in Nieu Bethesda for Robert Broom, the keeper of vertebrate palaeontology at the South African Museum. Kitching was the first member of staff to be appointed to the Bernard Price Institute for Palaeontological Research, set up at the University of Witwatersrand in 1945. In 1970,he was the first person to collect and identify a specimen of a Karoo therapsid in Antarctica and so demonstrate that Antarctica and southern Africa were once connected. Today, Kitching's work is stored at the Kitching Fossil Exploration Centre which depicts the setting in the area around Nieu Bethesda 253 million years ago during the Permian Period. 

The town is also the focal point in Athol Fugard's play, "Road to Mecca" in 1985.

Nieu Bethesda today

The town of Nieu Bethesda has about 1540 residents.  The town is still racially divided with the African (25.06%) residents staying mostly in the Kloofroad area of Pienaarsig. The Coloured (65.19% of the town population) and Black African (22% of the population) residents abide in Pienaarsig, the former township and the White residents (8.70% of the town population) stay along the banks of the Gats River that runs through the town. Nieu Bethesda is surrounded by 8 commercial farms which provide employment for locals. There are also tourism projects such as Kitching Fossil Exploration Centre, Bethesda Arts Centre and The Owl House which generate income for the town. There are no ATMs in Nieu Bethesda and the town relies on Graaff Reinet for banking services.  There is one school known as the Lettie de Klerk Primary School in Pienaarsig. For health services, Nieu Bethesda has one clinic and a resident sister.

References

External links 

 Owl House
 Kitching Fossil Exploration Centre

Populated places in the Dr Beyers Naudé Local Municipality
Populated places established in 1875
Karoo